Ragnitz is a municipality in the district of Leibnitz in Styria, Austria.
Three castles are within the territories of Ragnitz : Schloss Frauheim, Schloss Laubegg and Schloss Rohr

References

Cities and towns in Leibnitz District